TKZee is a South African kwaito music group formed in 1990s by three school friends, Tokollo Tshabalala, Kabelo Mabalane, and Zwai Bala. The group shot to prominence in late 1997 and early 1998 with their chart-topping  singles "Phalafala" and "Shibobo".

1996 their debut EP was released titled Take It Easy, but did not sell well. December 1997 the group released their second EP "Phalafala", sampling Joni Mitchell's "Big Yellow Taxi". The song became a hit, with the CD single selling over 100,000 units. The group's next big release was in the run-up to the 1998 FIFA World Cup. In collaboration with Bafana Bafana and then-Ajax striker Benni McCarthy, the group produced the third EP Shibobo in June 1998. The song, which contained samples of Europe's The Final Countdown and featured McCarthy rapping on some of the lyrics, was an instant success. Sales topped the 100 000 mark in just over a month, a feat which made Shibobo the fastest and biggest selling CD single by a South African recording artist in history. They quickly became household names not just in South Africa but across the continent.

Later in 1998, they released their first full album, Halloween, which became a huge hit with smash singles "Dlala Mapansula", "Mambotjie" & "We Love This Place". The album was certified  Platinum by the Recording industry of South Africa (RISA), with sales over 200 000 copies and earned them 4 awards at South African Music Awards (SAMA) for Best Kwaito Album, Best Duo/Group, Best Single and Best Kwaito Single. In 1999 they produced Guz 2001, a compilation album by TKZee Family, consisting of the original TKZee members alongside other names on their record label TKZ Wrekords, including Gwyza, Loyiso, 2 shot and Dr Mageu sharing the musical stage with Kutlwano Masote and jazz genius Moses Taiwa Molelekwa.

In 2008 after an 8 year hiatus the group reunited touring around the country and around the world in countries like denmark. The following year Tkzee released their third album titled Coming Home with the singles Sdudla and Dikakapa. They performed their hit single Shibobo at the opening ceremony of the 2010 FIFA World Cup at Soccer City (FNB stadium) in Johannesburg. On 15 August 2022 Tokollo Tshabalala died. According to a press statement released by his family, the musician died from an epileptic seizure on Monday morning. He was 45. His family says he developed epileptic seizures from a severe brain injury he sustained during a car accident in 2001.

Discography

Singles
"Take It Easy" (1996)
"Phalafala" (1997)
"Masimbela" (1997)  
"Shibobo" (1998)  
"Dlala Mapansula" (1998)   
"Mambotjie/We Love This Place"(1999)
"Fiasco" (1999)
"Izinja Zam" (2000)
"Ibola lethu" (2002)
"S'dudla" (2009)
"Dikakapa" (2010)

Albums/EP's
1996: Take It Eazy
1997: Phalafala
1998: Shibobo
1998: Halloween
1999: Guz 2001 (TKZee family) 
2001: Trinity 
2004 Guz hits
2009 Coming Home

Awards  and nominations

References

External links 
Article on TKZee
 

Kwaito musicians
South African musical groups